Il Contratto (also known as 'The Contract') is a 1953 Australian film from Giorgio Mangiamele and Italian migrants in Australia. It was completed within a year of Mangiamele's arrival in Australia from Italy.

Plot
Four young single Italian men (Giuseppe Michelini, Luigi Borsi, Giuseppe Cusato, Giorgio Mangiamele) travel to Melbourne by boat. Their trip was financed by loans from a travel agency, attracted by an Australian government scheme that promises them two years' guaranteed employment. They settle in inner-city accommodation, but find it impossible to obtain work in the midst of Australia's 1952–53 recession. Together with a woman friend, the men move to a farm outside Melbourne. After some initial setbacks, they earn enough money to pay off the agency loans.

Cast
Giorgio Mangiamele

References

External links
Il Contratto at Australian Screen Online

Australian drama films
1953 films
1953 drama films